The 2004 Rhein Fire season was the tenth season for the franchise in the NFL Europe League (NFLEL). The team was led by head coach Pete Kuharchek in his fourth year, and played its home games at Arena AufSchalke in Gelsenkirchen, Germany. They finished the regular season in fifth place with a record of three wins and seven losses.

Offseason

Free agent draft

Personnel

Staff

Roster

Schedule

Standings

Game summaries

Week 1: vs Cologne Centurions

Week 2: vs Scottish Claymores

Week 3: at Frankfurt Galaxy

Week 4: vs Berlin Thunder

Week 5: at Scottish Claymores

Week 6: vs Amsterdam Admirals

Week 7: at Berlin Thunder

Week 8: at Cologne Centurions

Week 9: vs Frankfurt Galaxy

Week 10: at Amsterdam Admirals

Notes

References

Rhein
Rhein Fire seasons
Rhein
Rhein